Jason Rilwann Aguemon (born April 14, 1992) is a French professional gridiron football running back for the Paris Musketeers.

Early years
Aguemon began playing American football in the youth ranks of La Courneuve Flash. He finished second with the French U19 national team at the 2011 European Junior Championships in Cologne. The following year, he became the French junior champion with the Flash. After the conclusion of the French season, Aguemon was signed by the Lübeck Cougars from the GFL 2 in July 2015. In five games, he recorded 163 rushing yards and 21 receiving yards for a total of two touchdowns. He then returned to the Flash and won the Casque de Diamant, the French championship final, with the team in 2017 and 2018. In 2018, Aguemon was also part of the French national team that became European champions in Vantaa. In the final against Austria, he recorded 63 rushing yards and a touchdown. In the 2019 season, he was mainly used as a defensive player.

Professional career
After participating in a Canadian Football League (CFL) hosted Combine in Paris in January 2020, he was invited to the CFL Combine scheduled in Toronto in late March. Due to the COVID-19 pandemic, the event was cancelled and virtually made up in 2021. Aguemon went undrafted in the 2021 CFL Global Draft.

In May 2021, Aguemon signed with the Leipzig Kings for the inaugural season of the European League of Football (ELF). Aguemon posted the fifth most rushing yards in the league (518), but missed the playoffs with the Kings and a record of five wins to five losses. Aguemon moved to the newly formed Rhein Fire franchise for the 2022 ELF season, where he began the season as a starter before having to relinquish that role to Daniel Rennich. He was released by the Fire midway through the season in late July. In October 2022, Aguemon ended his national team career after the European Championship group stage match against Austria.

Aguemon returned home for the 2023 season, signing a contract with the newly formed Paris Musketeers franchise.

Professional statistics

Private life
Aguemon is the cousin of American football players Ibel Ahidazan, Armel Ahidazan and Maxe Ahidazan.

Bobsledding
In December 2017, Aguemon participated as a pusher in the four-man bobsleigh in the 2017–18 IBSF Europe Cup competitions in Königssee and La Plagne.

References

1992 births
Living people
American football running backs
French players of American football
Leipzig Kings players
European League of Football players
German Football League players
Expatriate players of American football
French expatriate sportspeople in Germany
French expatriate sportspeople in Austria